Tales of Dunk and Egg is a series of fantasy novellas by George R. R. Martin, set in the world of his A Song of Ice and Fire novels. They follow the adventures of "Dunk" (the future Lord Commander of the Kingsguard, Ser Duncan the Tall) and "Egg" (the future king Aegon V Targaryen), some 90 years before the events of the novels.

Three novellas have been published – The Hedge Knight (1998), The Sworn Sword (2003), and The Mystery Knight (2010) – and Martin has stated his intention to continue the series. A collection of the existing three novellas, with illustrations by Gary Gianni, was published as A Knight of the Seven Kingdoms on October 6, 2015.

The Hedge Knight
The first novella was originally published August 25, 1998 in the Legends anthology, edited by Robert Silverberg. The story was later adapted into a six-issue comic book limited series by Ben Avery, drawn by Mike S. Miller, produced by Roaring Studios (now Dabel Brothers Productions) and published by Image Comics and Devil's Due between August 2003 and May 2004. Devil's Due published the complete limited series as a graphic novel in June 2004. Following the termination of the partnership between Dabel Brothers and Devil's Due, the graphic novel has been republished in various editions.

Plot
Upon the death of a nomadic 'hedge knight', Ser Arlan of Pennytree, his squire Dunk adopts Ser Arlan's armor as his own, as well as his equipment, three horses, and remaining money, in hope of winning more gold at the town of Ashford, under the name of 'Ser Duncan the Tall'. En route, he gains his own squire in a boy nicknamed 'Egg'. At Ashford, Dunk sells one of his horses for a suit of armor by the smith Pate, and befriends Ser Steffon Fossoway's squire and cousin, Raymun Fossoway. Without proof of his knighthood, he is nearly barred from competition until Prince Baelor Targaryen vouches for him. Forbidden to use Ser Arlan's coat of arms, Dunk commissions an attractive young puppeteer named Tanselle to paint a new one. Dunk watches the first day of competition, with Egg on his shoulders. After several spectacular tilts, Baelor's nephew, Prince Aerion Targaryen, disgraces himself by killing Ser Humfrey Hardyng's horse.

When Dunk retires into the Fossoways' tent to drink with Raymun, Egg reveals that Tanselle is being beaten by Prince Aerion, who is offended at the notion of the puppet knight defeating a dragon. Dunk rushes to defend Tanselle and attacks Aerion; when the royal guard arrests Dunk, Egg reveals that he is actually Prince Aegon Targaryen, Aerion's younger brother. After meeting Prince Baelor again, Dunk chooses trial by combat rather than mutilation for his attack on Aerion, who demands a 'Trial of Seven' (in which two parties of seven knights contend on horseback). Steffon and Raymun, and later Aegon, promise to acquire Duncan's partisans; and Aerion's other brother Prince Daeron, called the Drunken, warns Dunk that his father will have three knights of the Kingsguard fight in the trial.

Dunk is met again by Pate, who presents him with a new shield, originally an old one that was re-rimmed in new steel by Pate and that Tanselle has painted in his chosen sigil - an elm tree silhouetted against the sunset with a shooting star - and left for him before departing. At the morning of the trial, Raymun brings Ser Humfrey Hardyng and Ser Humfrey Beesbury to Duncan's side; and Aegon brings Ser Robyn Rhysling and Ser Lyonel Baratheon (called the "Laughing Storm"). Steffon sides with the accusers for the reward of a lordship; and Raymun begs to be knighted and fight in Steffon's place. Dunk hesitates, because his own knighthood is dubious, and Lyonel grants Raymun his knighthood - however, Dunk is still one knight short. Finally, Prince Baelor announces that he will champion Dunk himself. In the resulting joust, Dunk is unhorsed by Aerion, but beats him into submission, and Aerion recants his accusation. The fighting costs the lives of both Humfreys; and Baelor himself is later revealed to have suffered a blow to the head, stuck by Maekar's mace, after removing his helm, perishing from the injury shortly afterwards to the lament of many present. Prince Maekar, Aegon's father, later offers Dunk a position in his household to train Aegon; but Dunk insists on permission to travel, and takes Aegon as his squire, under his former alias of 'Egg'. Thereafter Dunk and Egg set out to Dorne.

The Sworn Sword
The second novella was published in 2003 in the Legends II anthology, also edited by Robert Silverberg. The story has been adapted into a graphic novel by Ben Avery and drawn by Mike S. Miller, in cooperation with publisher and distributor Marvel Comics. The first comic was released on June 20, 2007, and the graphic novel was released on June 18, 2008.

Plot
The story begins in the Reach with Duncan the Tall sworn to Ser Eustace Osgrey of Standfast, and illuminates several aspects of the feudal system of Westeros. A series of flashbacks narrated by Ser Eustace relate the events of the Blackfyre Rebellion and its conclusion at the Battle of the Redgrass Field.

At the fort of Standfast, Dunk and Ser Eustace's other sworn sword, Ser Bennis the Brown, discover that a dam has been built across the local stream, by peasants in service to Lady Rohanne Webber of Coldmoat. Bennis reacts angrily, cutting the cheek of one of the peasants. Upon hearing the news, Ser Eustace realizes that Lady Webber will be angered by Bennis's actions against her servants, and orders Dunk and Bennis to train levies from his three villages. For a peaceful solution, Eustace sends Dunk to Coldmoat, where Dunk learns that Lady Rohanne stands to lose her lands to a male cousin if she does not take a fifth husband by the second anniversary of her father's death. Her castellan, the haughty Ser Lucas Inchfield (known as the "Long Inch" for his 6-foot 7-inch height), is her most insistent suitor, but she has already refused him. Dunk fails to change the Lady's mind on either the dam's construction or seeking justice for her servant, and Rohanne informs him that Ser Eustace is a former traitor, who supported the usurper Daemon Blackfyre, and has therefore been stripped of most of his lands. When Dunk attempts to appeal to Rohanne's fond memories of Eustace's youngest son, Addam, she angrily slaps him and demands he leave; as Dunk departs, he learns that she was once in love with Addam, who died at Redgrass Field.

Shocked by the news of Ser Eustace's past treason, Dunk returns to Standfast to leave the old knight's service. That night, Ser Eustace's forest is burned, and Duncan recalls Lady Rohanne's threat of "fire and sword" to destroy Standfast. He therefore disperses the levies, and promises to oppose Lady Rohanne himself. At the river, Dunk rides into the ford to parley with Lady Rohanne where the noise of the water will prevent anyone on either bank from overhearing them. Before he enters the stream, Ser Eustace suggests that Dunk should kill Lady Rohanne at this meeting. Instead, Dunk offers his own blood to Lady Rohanne by slicing his cheek. This pays the debt for the wounded peasant; and for the claim that Lady Rohanne had the forest burned, she demands an apology or vindication, and all agree upon trial by combat between Dunk and Ser Lucas, to be fought in the stream as the only neutral ground present. In the fight, Dunk is nearly outfought by Ser Lucas, but drowns him and nearly drowns himself, but is resuscitated by Lady Rohanne's maester. When he awakens, Dunk learns that Ser Eustace and Lady Rohanne are now married, to reconcile their debts. Before Dunk leaves, Rohanne implies that she would have sooner married Dunk if he was not of low birth, but instead offers him her finest mare to make amends; and when he refuses, Lady Rohanne insists that he take something to remember her by, and he pulls her into a passionate kiss, and takes a length of her hair as a keepsake. Thereafter he and Egg ride with the intent to reach the Wall.

The Mystery Knight
The third novella was published in 2010 in the anthology Warriors, edited by George R. R. Martin and Gardner Dozois.

Like The Sworn Sword, the book takes place during the reign of Aerys I and the aftermath of the Blackfyre Rebellion is examined in more detail.

Plot
The story begins with Dunk and Egg leaving Stoney Sept, to ask service with Lord Beron Stark against Greyjoy raids on the northern coast.  On the way they encounter a septon beheaded for preaching treason; and later a group of knights and minor lords traveling to a tourney in honor of the wedding of Lord Butterwell of Whitewalls to a Frey of the Crossing, wherein the victor's prize is a dragon egg. Dunk takes a dislike to Gorman Peake, whom he believes the killer of his own mentor's former squire. Egg tells Dunk that Peake's arms of three castles on an orange field is because the Peake family owned three castles, but forfeited two to the Crown when Peake sided with Blackfyre. During the journey Dunk befriends three other itinerant knights: Ser Maynard Plumm, Ser Kyle the Cat of Misty Moor, and Ser Glendon Ball who claims to be the bastard son of the famous knight Quentyn "Fireball", who fought for Daemon Blackfyre.

The wedding is set at Whitewalls and Lord Frey arrives with his four-year-old heir, Walder Frey, and his fifteen-year-old daughter, who weds Lord Butterwell (and is alleged to have been caught by Walder having lost her virginity to a servant). Egg becomes increasingly suspicious when he sees that most of the competitors belonged to the rebel party. During the wedding Dunk is drafted by John the Fiddler to carry the bride to the bedchamber. Dunk does so and later hears from John that the latter once saw Duncan himself, in a dream, in the armor of the royal guard. Dunk enters the first match of the joust under the name of 'Gallows Knight' (for a new shield acquired after the loss of his own); but is defeated in the first tilt by Ser Uthor Underleaf, known as the Snail Knight for his sigil.  Duncan later gives Underleaf his armor and horse as forfeit, and Underleaf informs Dunk that someone bribed him to kill Dunk in the final tilt. Before the jousting continues, word spreads through the castle that the dragon egg is missing, and the blame is placed on Ser Glendon Ball, who is imprisoned by Peake. In search of the absent Egg, Duncan is wounded by Alyn Cockshaw, who claims to have bribed Uthor Underleaf, and throws him into a well. Maynard Plumm comes to Duncan's aid, and it is discovered that Plumm is one of Brynden "Bloodraven" Rivers' many spies (or possibly Bloodraven himself), and that John the Fiddler is the eponymous son of Daemon Blackfyre. Dunk finds Egg in the sept with the cowering Lord Butterwell, who on discovering Egg's true identity is terrified for his life. Lord Butterwell's son-in-law Black Tom Heddle tries to kill Egg to incite a war, and is killed by Duncan, who thereupon tells Egg to flee with Butterwell.  To buy time for Egg's escape Dunk confronts the younger Daemon Blackfyre, and accuses Gorman Peake of falsely charging Ball with the theft of the dragon egg.

Daemon allows Ball to prove his innocence in trial by combat, in which Ser Glendon soundly defeats Daemon. By this time a large army under Bloodraven, who is also the King's Hand, encircles Whitewalls, and Daemon is captured. Dunk and Egg meet Bloodraven, and Egg demands that Bloodraven reward Glendon, Duncan, and the other hedge knights. For surrendering to Bloodraven without a fight, Lord Butterwell is spared his life and allowed a tenth of his wealth; but his fortress is forfeit to the Iron Throne and torn down.  Bloodraven, at Egg's request, gives Dunk the gold to ransom his armor. When Egg asks Bloodraven what became of the dragon egg, Bloodraven implies it was taken by an agent of his (thought to be one of the performing dwarfs at the wedding).

Planned installments

Martin has said that he would like to write a number of these stories (varying from six to twelve from interview to interview) covering the entire lives of these two characters.

In 2011 he talked about working on the fourth novella, which was originally to be included in the anthology Dangerous Women, and a year after that it and the three previously published Dunk and Egg tales were to be collected and published in the U.S. by Bantam Spectra as a stand-alone fix-up novel. The working title of the fourth novella was The She-Wolves of Winterfell. As of late 2013, work on the story has been postponed while Martin completes The Winds of Winter. In April 2014, Martin also announced that he had roughed out another Dunk and Egg story with the working title The Village Hero which would be set in the Riverlands. He noted that he was not sure which of these two would be completed first. In 2015, Martin noted that in addition to She-Wolves and The Village Hero he had notes and fairly specific ideas for a number of further installments, including The Sellsword, The Champion, The Kingsguard, and The Lord Commander, taking the planned series total to as many as nine novellas.

Adaptations
The novellas were adapted as comic books which were reprinted as graphic novels:

Martin wrote in 2014 that film or TV adaptations of the novellas are being discussed. He suggested that because HBO owns the TV rights to the setting of Westeros (if not to the characters of the novellas), it would be preferable to have HBO adapt the novellas as well.

On January 21, 2021, Variety reported that an adaptation of the Tales of Dunk and Egg series, a prequel to the events of Game of Thrones, is in early development on HBO.

Family tree

References

External links
 
 Review and interview on suvudu.com
 
 

Book series introduced in 1998
American novellas
A Song of Ice and Fire books
Novels by George R. R. Martin
Books by George R. R. Martin
1998 novels
2003 novels
2010 novels